Davy Crockett: King of the Wild Frontier is a 1955 American Western film produced by Walt Disney Productions. It is an edited and recut compilation of the first three episodes of the Davy Crockett television miniseries. The episodes used were Davy Crockett Indian Fighter, Davy Crockett Goes to Congress, and Davy Crockett at the Alamo. The film stars Fess Parker as Davy Crockett.

Plot

Creek Indian Wars
Two Tennessee wilderness settlers, Davy Crockett and his best friend George Russell (son of Captain William Russell and Agness H. Mccollough), volunteer to fight with General Andrew Jackson and Major Tobias Norton in the Creek War (1813-1814). They return home after a successful battle, to make sure their families have enough provisions for the winter, rejoining a short time later to find the Americans at a stalemate against the Creeks, with Jackson having gone to New Orleans. Against Norton's orders, Crockett and Russell scout for Creek positions, and Russell is captured.

Crockett tracks the Creeks to their camp, where he challenges the remaining Creek chief, Red Stick, to a tomahawk duel for Russell's life. Crockett wins, but agrees to spare Red Stick's life in exchange for his signing the American peace treaty.

Off to Congress
Crockett and Russell head west to scout virgin territory being opened for settlement, planning to send for Davy's family once a cabin has been built. They acquire a claim after beating Bigfoot Mason in a shooting contest. They learn that Mason is running Native Americans off their land in order to resell it, and befriend a family of Cherokee  refugees Mason has victimized. Crockett offers to become the magistrate for the area. Crockett defeats Mason in hand-to-hand combat before arresting him and his surviving accomplice (the other one having been shot dead when he tried to shoot Crockett).

Crockett is convinced to run for the state legislature against Amos Thorpe, a corrupt politician in league with men trying to claim Cherokee lands, who is running unopposed. He then receives a letter from his sister-in-law telling him that his wife has died of a fever. Crockett wins the election handily and becomes a popular member of the Tennessee General Assembly. He reunites with Norton and Andrew Jackson, who is running for President of the United States and convinces him to run for the United States House of Representatives.

After he enters Congress, Norton, trying to pass a bill to usurp Native American treaty lands, has Crockett embark on a speaking tour across the eastern United States to distract him, but Russell learns of the bill and brings Crockett back to Washington to argue against it. Crockett tears the bill in half before leaving, ending his political career.

The Alamo
Crockett decides to join the Battle of the Alamo (1836), joined by George Russell. While traveling to San Antonio, they are joined by Thimblerig, a riverboat gambler, and Busted Luck, a Comanche tribesman. Reaching the Alamo, they join its defense, though Colonel James Bowie confides that their supplies are dangerously low. Russell manages to slip through the enemy lines to try to bring back help, only to return empty-handed. The Texan garrison withstands several attacks from Mexican troops before being overcome. George Russell, Thimblerig, Busted Luck, Travis, and a bedridden Colonel Bowie are all killed, leaving Crockett the sole defender standing. Crockett is last seen swinging his rifle against the encroaching Mexicans; the scene then fades to a shot of the Lone Star Flag and Crockett's journal closing on its last entry "March 6, 1836 - Liberty and Independence Forever!", accompanied by a reprise of "The Ballad of Davy Crockett".

Production
Most footage was shot in Tennessee and Wildwood Regional Park in Thousand Oaks, California.

The three segments comprising the film, which originally aired on Walt Disney's Disneyland, were popular enough for Walt Disney to release them theatrically. The film remains Disney's most successful television film project, inspiring two prequel episodes for the television series which were later released in theaters as Davy Crockett and the River Pirates.

Cast
 Fess Parker as Davy Crockett
 Buddy Ebsen as George "Georgie" Russell
 William Bakewell as Tobias Norton
 Basil Ruysdael as Andrew Jackson 
 Pat Hogan as Chief Red Stick
 Mike Mazurki as Bigfoot Mason
 Hans Conried as Thimblerig
 Don Megowan as William B. Travis 
 Helene Stanley as Polly Crockett
 Kenneth Tobey as James Bowie
 Campbell Brown as Bruno
 Jefferson Thompson as Charlie Two Shirts
 Nick Cravat as Busted Luck 
 Jim Maddux as Congressman #1
 Robert Booth as Congressman #2
 Eugene Brindel as Billy Crockett
 Benjamin Hornbuckle as Henderson
 Henry Joyner as Swaney
 Ray Whitetree as Johnny Crockett
 Hal Youngblood as Opponent of political speaker

Songs
 "The Ballad of Davy Crockett" – Lyrics by Tom Blackburn, music by George Bruns, sung by The Wellingtons
 "Farewell to the Mountains" – Poem by Davy Crockett, music by George Bruns, sung by Fess Parker

See also
 List of American films of 1955

References

External links
 
 

1955 films
1950s English-language films
Walt Disney Pictures films
1955 Western (genre) films
Cherokee in popular culture
Films directed by Norman Foster
Films produced by Walt Disney
American folklore films and television series
American Indian Wars films
Texas Revolution films
American Western (genre) films
1955 war films
Films set in 1813
Films set in 1814
Films set in 1836
Films set in Tennessee
Films shot in North Carolina
Films shot in Tennessee
Films shot in California
Films based on television series
Compilation films
Films about Andrew Jackson
Cultural depictions of Davy Crockett
Films about Native Americans
Films scored by George Bruns
Films edited from television programs
1950s American films